The Moskalyev SAM-6 was an experimental design intended to test the suitability of monowheel undercarriages, lighter than conventional gear, on tailless aircraft.

Design
The wooden SAM-6 had a conventional tail on its short fuselage but its low wing had, in addition, Scheibe-type, oval wingtip fins and rudders. Sprung skids on their underside provided the lateral stability that its central undercarriage did not.

Development

For its first flight, made in early 1934, the SAM-6 had a long, non-retracting central ski rather than a wheel, and tail ski rather than a skid, both mounted on vertical shock-absorbing struts.  The trials were reasonably successful and the main ski was replaced by a wheel in a trouser fairing. No reports from tests with this landing gear are known but by late 1934 the SAM-6 had been modified into the more conventional SAM-6bis, which had two fixed, trousered mainwheels. It also had a second, tandem seat in an enclosed, instrumented cockpit.

Variants
SAM-6 Original configuration with central mono-skid/wheel main gear. Single-seater with open cockpit.
SAM-6bis Conventional, twin mainwheel gear and a second seat in enclosed cockpit.

Specifications

References

Single-engined tractor aircraft
1930s Soviet experimental aircraft
Moskalyev aircraft